Pungwe River ( or Rio Púnguè) is a  long river in Zimbabwe and Mozambique. It rises below Mount Nyangani in the Eastern Highlands of Zimbabwe and then flows southeasteastward through the Manica and Sofala provinces of Mozambique. The Pungwe enters the Urema Valley, the southernmost portion of the Great Rift Valley, where it forms the southern boundary of Gorongosa National Park. The Urema River joins it, and the river follows the rift valley southward. Large seasonal wetlands form around the Pungwe and Urema rivers in the rift valley section. It empties into the Mozambique Channel at Beira, forming a large estuary. It is one of the major rivers of Mozambique and often causes floods.

Tributaries
The principal left tributaries are, from upstream to downstream, the Nhazonia, Txatola, Vinduzi, and Nhandugue-Urema. The right tributaries are the Honde and the Muda.

Pungwe basin
Administratively, the Pungwe Basin covers parts of Sofala and Manica provinces in Mozambique, and a large part of Mutasa District in Zimbabwe. A small portion of the basin in Zimbabwe falls in Nyanga District. As of 2003, the basin's population in Mozambique is estimated at about 1,104,000 people and that for Zimbabwe at 96,000 people.

Water supply systems
Beira metropolitan area in Mozambique receives its water supply from the Pungwe River. The 2004 water demand from the Beira/Dondo water supply, which included the Mutua and Mafambisse areas, was estimated at /day.

The city of Mutare is supplied from the Pungwe River through an inter-catchment transfer facility. The quantities transferred to are limited to a maximum of /second by the provisions of a water permit and system design. In addition, on 27 September 1995, it was agreed at a meeting of the Mozambican and Zimbabwean ministers responsible for water affairs that water could be abstracted from the Pungwe River to supply the city of Mutare, with an upper limit of /second. The Mutasa Rural District is also expected to draw water from the Pungwe pipeline to supply villages along its route.

Climate change is predicted to lead to about 10% reduction in annual rainfall. This implies decreased river flow and available water for the Pungwe River basin, with possibly severe consequences for agricultural production. While the between-year variability in flow is not predicted to change significantly, within-year variability is expected to increase. This will worsen both floods and droughts.

References

External links
 Pungwe River Project
 NASA: Earth from Space

Rivers of Mozambique
Rivers of Zimbabwe
Mozambique Channel
International rivers of Africa